Henry Arthur Herbert, 1st Earl of Powis PC (before 9 April 1703 – 10 September 1772), known as Henry Herbert until 1743 and as The Lord Herbert of Chirbury between 1743 and 1748, was a British peer and politician.

Background
A member of the Herbert family, he was the son of Francis Herbert, of Oakly Park near Ludlow, Shropshire, son of Richard Herbert by his wife and second cousin once removed, Florence, daughter of Richard Herbert, 2nd Baron Herbert of Chirbury. His mother was Dorothy, daughter of John Oldbury, a merchant of London. He was baptised at the parish church of Bromfield near Oakly Park.

Political career
Herbert was returned to parliament as a Whig for Bletchingley in 1724, a seat he held until 1727, and then represented Ludlow until 1743. In 1735 he became Custos Rotulorum of Montgomeryshire and Lord-Lieutenant of Shropshire, and was Treasurer to the Prince of Wales (father of George III) from 1737 to 1738. In 1743 he was elevated to the peerage as Baron Herbert of Chirbury, in the County of Shropshire, a revival of the title (spelt "Cherbury") which had been held in his family from 1629 until becoming extinct on the death of a son of his great-grandfather in 1691. Five years later he was created Baron Powis, of Powis Castle in the County of Montgomery, Viscount Ludlow, in the County of Shropshire, and Earl of Powis, in the County of Montgomery, a revival of the Powis title which had become extinct on the death of the third Marquess of Powis the same year. The following year he was also made Baron Herbert of Chirbury and Ludlow, with remainder to firstly his brother Richard Herbert and secondly to his kinsman Francis Herbert, of Ludlow.

In 1761 Lord Powis relinquished his position as Lord-Lieutenant of Shropshire and was appointed Lord-Lieutenant of Montgomeryshire instead, but he was reinstated to the Lord-Lieutenancy of Shropshire in 1764 and held both posts until his death eight years later. Also in 1761 he was appointed Comptroller of the Household and sworn of the Privy Council. He was promoted to Treasurer of the Household later the same year, a post he held until 1765.

Military positions
During the time of the Jacobite rising of 1745, when Prince Charles Edward Stuart's Scots army was about to invade England, Powis was commissioned as Colonel on 1 October that year to raise a regiment of fusiliers in Shropshire to counter the invasion.  They were ordered to march into Staffordshire but, being insufficiently disciplined and manned, they fell back without joining battle against the Jacobite troops who were feared to be heading for Wales but diverted towards Derby instead.

Powis never saw active service but he was given further promotions as Major-General in 1755, Lieutenant-General in 1759, and full General in 1772, the year of his death.

Family
In 1751, he married the fifteen-year-old Barbara Herbert, posthumous daughter and heiress of Lord Edward Herbert, younger son of William Herbert, 2nd Marquess of Powis, and brother of William Herbert, 3rd Marquess of Powis. Lord and Lady Powis had two children:
 George Edward Henry Arthur Herbert, 2nd Earl of Powis (1755-1801); died unmarried.
 Lady Henrietta Antonia Herbert (1758-1830); married Edward Clive, 2nd Baron Clive, who was later created Earl of Powis, and had issue.

Later life and death 
Oakly Park was his main country home until 1771, when he sold it to Lord Clive ('Clive of India') and moved into Powis Castle, the seat of his Earldom, near Welshpool, Montgomeryshire.

Lord Powis died at Bath, Somerset, in September 1772 aged 69, and was buried in St Mary's Church, Welshpool. He was succeeded by his son, George (who also succeeded in the barony of Herbert of Chirbury and Ludlow as the persons in special remainder to that peerage had died before Lord Powis). The earldom became extinct on the latter's death in 1801.

Lord Powis's daughter, Lady Henrietta, married Edward Clive, 2nd Baron Clive, son of Robert Clive, 1st Baron Clive ("Clive of India"). In 1804, the Earldom of Powis was revived in favour of Edward Clive. Barbara, Countess of Powis, died in March 1786, aged 50.

References

|-

|-

1700s births
1772 deaths
Year of birth uncertain
British MPs 1722–1727
British MPs 1727–1734
British MPs 1734–1741
British MPs 1741–1747
Earls of Powis
Peers of Great Britain created by George II
Lord-Lieutenants of Shropshire
Lord-Lieutenants of Montgomeryshire
Members of the Parliament of Great Britain for English constituencies
Members of the Privy Council of Great Britain
Treasurers of the Household
Herbert family